Nojoom al Baazah is a Libyan football club currently playing the Libyan Second Division. The club is based in Baazah, a city in Zliten, near Misrata. They are in Group B of the Second Division.

History
The idea of founding the club Baazah Club of Zleetn was initially gathered by the youth sports area in the city of Zliten, and this idea was accepted with much encouragement by the people of the region.

This forum (Bazh Sports Forum) was established  on 23 July 1984. The adoption of the forum secretariat by the General Sports Committee was accepted officially on 11 October 1984 and the people of the region participated in many events and games at national level, under the name of Baazah Sports Forum.

Then began the important transformation and development, which was most important for the city of Baazah in Zliten, when the Forum became Baazah Sporting, Social and Cultural Club on 31 December 1984.

The adoption of this sporting, social and cultural club was the result of an agreement of Baazah Sports Forum to all of the conditions that the National Commission of Sports proposed for transfer to a Sporting, Social and Cultural Club. And so Baazah Sports Forum changed its name to Baazah Stars Sporting, Social & Cultural Club.

Those credited with the founding of Baazah Sports Forum and its subsequent change to Baazah Stars Sporting, Social & Cultural Club are:

 Mohamed Soufiah
 Omar Al-Hami
 Abdul Ghani Al Baazy
 Mohamed Mahmoud Arashah
 Ali Abu Bakar Alnuhaisy
 Shamsuddin Al Haady Indishah
 Emhamed Mohamed Aldriewy.

Management Committee

After the approval from the People's Committee for Sports under the resolution No. 36 of 1984. the Administrative Committee of the Forum was adopted, which was as follows:

 Conference Secretariat
 Mansoor Ahmed Bin Huraiz –  Secretary of the Conference
 People's Committee Secretariat
 Emhamed Ibrahim Aljaddaimi – Secretary of the commission

First Participators
The football club began its participation in the 1985–86 season.

Current squad
correct as of 22 December 2008

Football clubs in Libya
1984 establishments in Libya